Ohr Avner Chabad Day School  (also known as Chabad Ohr Avner) is an educational complex founded by Baku religious community of Jews.

The school was registered for a teaching license on April 25, 2003.

As a part of Ohr Avner Chabad strategy, a special attention is paid to development of spiritual and intellectual studies of every member of the community for further involvement in social infrastructure of Azerbaijan.

The complex is attended by over 290 schoolchildren and nearly 100 kindergarteners.

During his visit to Azerbaijan in 2016, Israeli Prime Minister Benjamin Netanyahu attended the school, met with the local Jewish community and gave a speech before students.

References

External links
 Jewish Religious Community of Baku "Jews of Azerbaijan"
 The Federation of Jewish Communities of the CIS

See also
History of the Jews in Azerbaijan
Mountain Jews
Qırmızı Qəsəbə, the primary settlement of Azerbaijan's population of Mountain Jews.

Chabad in Asia
Chabad schools
Educational institutions established in 1995
Schools in Baku
Azerbaijani Jews
Azerbaijan–Israel relations
1995 establishments in Azerbaijan